Friedrich Ohmann (21 December 1858, Lemberg - 6 April 1927, Vienna) was an Austrian architect in the Historicist style.

Life and work 

His father was a building official. In 1877, he began his studies in architecture at the Technical University in Vienna. In order to gain more creative training, he enrolled at the Academy of Fine Arts and studied with Friedrich von Schmidt.

From 1889 to 1899, he was a Professor of decorative architecture at the Academy of Arts, Architecture and Design in Prague, and was involved in several restoration projects.

He served as the artistic director for the Neue Hofburg from 1899 to 1907.

From 1904, he was the head of the master class for architecture at the Fine Arts Academy.

Early in 1918, he presented the first drafts for a large monument dedicated to Emperor Franz Joseph I, which he thought would be a logical addition to the Votivkirhe, but the project was never pursued after the war.

He was given an Ehrengrab ("honorary grave") by the City of Vienna. A street in Vienna's Döbling district is named after him.

References

Further reading 
 Reinhard Pühringer: Friedrich Ohmann (1858–1927), Protagonist des »genius loci«, zu Tradition und Aufbruch vom Frühwerk bis zu den Wiener Großprojekten (1884–1906/07). Dissertation from the Institute for Art History, University of Vienna, 2002.
 
 
 Felix Czeike (Ed.): Historisches Lexikon Wien, Vol.4, Kremayr & Scheriau, 1995  (Online)

External links 

 
 
 
 

1858 births
1927 deaths
Austrian architects
Academy of Fine Arts Vienna alumni
Academic staff of the Academy of Fine Arts Vienna
Architects from Lviv
Burials at the Vienna Central Cemetery
Academic staff of the Academy of Arts, Architecture and Design in Prague